IHL may refer to:
 International Hockey League (disambiguation), the name of several different defunct hockey leagues:
 International Professional Hockey League (1904–1907), central-eastern North America
 International Hockey League (1929–36), central-eastern North America
 International Hockey League (1945–2001), across North America
 International Hockey League (1992–96), Eastern Europe, now the Kontinental Hockey League
 International Hockey League (2007–2010), midwest North America, merged into the Central Hockey League
 International humanitarian law, the law that regulates the conduct of armed conflict (jus in bello)
 Internet Header Length, the second field in an IPv4 packet header